Paros is an island of the Cyclades group in the central Aegean Sea, which in 1389 became a separate lordship within the Duchy of the Archipelago that lasted until the Duchy's conquest by the Ottoman Empire in 1537.

Its rulers were:
 Maria Sanudo (died 1426) with her husband Gaspare Sommaripa (died 1402) 
 Crusino I Sommaripa (died 1462), son of Maria Sanudo and Gaspare Sommaripa
 Nicolò I Sommaripa (died 1505), son of Crusino I
 Fiorenza Sommaripa (died 1518), daughter of Nicolò I
 Nicolò Venier (1483-1531), son of Fiorenza
 Cecilia Venier (died 1543), daughter of Fiorenza

See also
Lordship of Andros

References
 

Paros
Paros
Duchy of the Archipelago
States and territories established in 1389
States and territories disestablished in the 1530s